Abdourahamane Mamane Lawali (born 8 March 1997) is a Nigerien footballer who plays as a defensive midfielder for Accra Hearts of Oak of Ghana Premier League.

Club career 
In March 2020, Mamane joined Ghanaian club Accra Hearts of Oak on a two-year contract. He scored his debut goal for Hearts after scoring the 5th goal from an assist from Frederick Ansah Botchway to push Hearts to a massive 6–1 victory over Bechem United.

International career
Mamane made his debut for Niger on 10 September 2019 against Morocco.

Honours

Club
AS Douanes
 Niger Premier League: 2016, 2017
 Niger Cup: 2015
Al-Merrikh

 Sudan Premier League: 2019–20

Hearts of Oak

 Ghana Premier League: 2020–21

References

External links

 

1997 births
Living people
Nigerien footballers
Niger international footballers
Association football midfielders
AS Douanes (Niger) players
Al-Merrikh SC players
Nigerien expatriate footballers
Nigerien expatriate sportspeople in Sudan
Expatriate footballers in Sudan
People from Niamey
Accra Hearts of Oak S.C. players
Ghana Premier League players
Expatriate footballers in Ghana
Nigerien expatriate sportspeople in Ghana